Oleksandr Volodymyrovych Zinchenko (born 15 December 1996) is a Ukrainian professional footballer who plays as a defender or midfielder  for  club Arsenal and the Ukraine national team.

Zinchenko began his career at Russian Premier League team Ufa before joining Manchester City in 2016 for a fee around £1.7 million. A versatile player, he started his career as an attacking midfielder, but eventually converted into a left back or wing back under Pep Guardiola. He has since won four Premier League titles, four League Cups and an FA Cup with the club.

A full Ukrainian international since 2015, Zinchenko represented his country at UEFA Euro 2020.

Club career

Early career
Zinchenko was born in Radomyshl, Zhytomyr Oblast. He is a product of Youth Sporitve School Karpatiya of his native Radomyshl (with first coach Serhiy Boretskyi), FC Monolit Illichivsk and Shakhtar Donetsk, where he became the captain of the youth team. On 9 December 2013, he scored a goal in a 1–1 draw with Manchester United in the 2013–14 UEFA Youth League.

He moved with his parents to Russia due to the war in Donbas. Shakhtar Donetsk wanted him back despite offering no playing time, but he did not return for security reasons. He spent between five and six months in the amateur leagues in Moscow. He then trained with Rubin Kazan but the club did not sign him to a contract since Zinchenko was still under contract to Shakhtar, and Rubin would risk incurring a transfer ban if they attempted to sign him.

On 12 February 2015, he signed a contract with Ufa. He made his Russian Premier League debut for Ufa on 20 March 2015 in a match against FC Krasnodar. On 25 July 2015, he scored his first goal in a 1–2 defeat against FC Rostov.

Manchester City

2016–2019

On 4 July 2016, Zinchenko signed for Premier League club Manchester City for an undisclosed fee believed to be around £1.7 million. The move surprised some. However, he was described by a Russian football scout as a "real talent", with Bundesliga club Borussia Dortmund also monitoring him.

Zinchenko was loaned to Eredivisie club PSV on 26 August, for the 2016–17 season. He made his debut on 1 October, as a substitute in a 1–1 draw against SC Heerenveen.

Zinchenko returned to Manchester City for the 2017–18 season, and made his debut on 24 October 2017, playing the full match including extra time in a 0–0 draw with Wolverhampton Wanderers in the EFL Cup. He made his first Premier League appearance on 13 December 2017, coming off the bench in a 4–0 away win at Swansea City.

On 18 December 2017, Zinchenko scored the winning penalty kick against Leicester City after a 1–1 stalemate in regulation time, sending Manchester City through to the semi-finals of the EFL Cup.

Zinchenko gained an extended run in the side following injuries to left backs Benjamin Mendy and Fabian Delph, putting in a number of consistent performances in the position.

Zinchenko made his first appearance of the 2018–19 season in a 3–0 away win at Oxford United in the EFL Cup. In the same week, he made his first league start of the season in a 2–0 home win against Brighton & Hove Albion, due to injuries to Mendy and Delph.

2019–2022
Zinchenko scored his first goal for Manchester City in the EFL Cup semi-final against Burton Albion on 9 January 2019, a 9–0 home win.

In June 2019, he signed a new contract with the club, to keep him with them until 2024.
On 25 October 2019, Zinchenko had a knee surgery in Barcelona. Manchester City coach Pep Guardiola told that the recovery from the injury would take from 5 to 6 weeks: "He had a contact with a knee. He felt something in the bone and had to stop. He had something to clean up the knee. It was not a big issue. Five or six weeks." At the beginning of December 2019, Zinchenko returned to full training. On 11 December 2019, he played his first game after the injury against Dinamo Zagreb. On 4 January 2020, he scored his second goal for Manchester City in a 4–1 win over Port Vale in the FA Cup. On 4 May 2021, Zinchenko was a part of the starting XI that saw Manchester City qualify for their first UEFA Champions League Final, after beating Paris Saint-Germain 2–0 on the night and 4–1 on aggregate. On 29 May, he later started that Champions League Final, which his team lost 1–0 against Chelsea.

Arsenal
On 22 July 2022, Zinchenko signed for Premier League club Arsenal on a long-term contract for a reported fee of £30 million, potentially rising to £32 million in add-ons. On 5 August, he made his club debut and registered his first assist with the club, in a 2–0 away win against Crystal Palace in the Premier League.

On 18 February 2023, Zinchenko scored his first Arsenal and Premier League goal, which was Arsenal's second in an eventual 4–2 win away at Aston Villa. This result helped Zinchenko's Gunners build their lead at the top of the Premier League.

International career
He made his international debut in a UEFA Euro 2016 qualification match against Spain on 12 October 2015. Zinchenko scored his first international goal in a friendly against neighbours Romania in Turin, which Ukraine won 4–3 on 29 May 2016. He also became Ukraine's youngest player to score an international goal at the age of 19 years and 165 days, beating a record held since 1996 by Andriy Shevchenko.

Zinchenko was included in Ukraine's squad for Euro 2016, appearing as a substitute for Viktor Kovalenko in both of Ukraine's first two matches, against Germany and Northern Ireland as Ukraine failed to score and were the first team eliminated.

On 24 March 2021, in a match against France, he became Ukraine's youngest player captain in their history at the age 24 years and 98 days. Later on, he was included in the squad for Euro 2020. On 29 June 2021, he scored the first goal and assisted the second goal in the Euro 2020 round of 16 match against Sweden, which ended in a 2–1 win for Ukraine after extra time, for which he was awarded the Star of the Match.

Personal life
In August 2020, Zinchenko married journalist Vlada Sedan. They have one daughter born in August 2021. Zinchenko identifies as an Eastern Orthodox Christian.

Zinchenko is a native Russian-speaker. He replies in Russian when asked in Ukrainian by Ukrainian journalists.

He is a vocal opponent of the 2022 Russian invasion of Ukraine. On 24 February 2022, he wrote on his Instagram that he wished for Vladimir Putin, the President of Russia, to die the most painful of deaths. The post was later deleted.

Career statistics

Club

International

Scores and results list Ukraine's goal tally first, score column indicates score after each Zinchenko goal

Honours
Manchester City
Premier League: 2017–18, 2018–19, 2020–21, 2021–22
FA Cup: 2018–19
EFL Cup: 2017–18, 2018–19, 2019–20, 2020–21
FA Community Shield: 2019
UEFA Champions League runner-up: 2020–21

Individual
Ukrainian Footballer of the Year: 2019

Notes

References

External links

Official website
Oleksandr Zinchenko at the Arsenal F.C. website
Oleksandr Zinchenko at the Premier League website

1996 births
Living people
Sportspeople from Zhytomyr Oblast
Ukrainian footballers
Association football defenders
Association football midfielders
FC Shakhtar Donetsk players
FC Ufa players
Manchester City F.C. players
Jong PSV players
PSV Eindhoven players
Arsenal F.C. players
Russian Premier League players
Premier League players
Eredivisie players
Eerste Divisie players
FA Cup Final players
Ukraine youth international footballers
Ukraine under-21 international footballers
Ukraine international footballers
UEFA Euro 2016 players
UEFA Euro 2020 players
Ukrainian expatriate footballers
Expatriate footballers in England
Expatriate footballers in the Netherlands
Expatriate footballers in Russia
Ukrainian expatriate sportspeople in England
Ukrainian expatriate sportspeople in the Netherlands
Ukrainian expatriate sportspeople in Russia